Tan Tai Yong is a Singaporean academic and politician who served as the President of Yale-NUS College from 2017 to 2022. He is also Director of the Institute of South Asian Studies, an autonomous university-level research institute in NUS. He was a former Nominated Member of Parliament and served from 2014 to 2015.

Education 
Tan earned a Bachelor of Arts and Master of Arts from the National University of Singapore. He then earned a PhD in South Asian history from Cambridge University, under the supervision of Anthony Low.

Career 
He has been a faculty member of the Department of History at NUS since 1992. He also served the Faculty of Arts and Social Sciences as Sub-Dean (1994–1999), Head of the History Department (2000–2003), Vice-Dean (2001–2003), and Dean (2004–2009). overseeing student matters, University Town and the Residential Colleges, the Centre for English Language and Communication, as well as the Office of Student Affairs and the Halls of Residence.

He was the Founding Director of the Institute of South Asian Studies, serving from 2004 to 2015. He served as Co-chair of the joint Yale and National University of Singapore committee in 2011.

He was appointed to the Singapore Social Sciences Research Council in 2016.

Research 
Tan's research interests are in the areas of Sikh diaspora, civil-military relations, social and political history of colonial Punjab, and the partition of South Asia. Lately, he has shifted his attention to Southeast Asia, and has been exploring issues of networks formation and the place of maritime cities in the region.

Selected publications
 A 700 Year History of Singapore. From Classical Emporium to World City (with Kwa Chong Guan and Derek Heng), National Archives Singapore, 2009.
 Creating "Greater Malaysia": Decolonization and the Politics of Merger
 
 
 Beyond Degrees: The Making of the National University of Singapore (with Edwin Lee). Singapore: Singapore University Press, 1996.
 Singapore Khalsa Association. Singapore: Times Books International, 1988. (Second Edition, published by Marshall Cavendish, 2006)

Prize and Fellowship
Some of the prize and fellowship awards received by Tan Tai Yong includes:
Moncado Prize for outstanding essay published in the Journal of Military History. 
The Wolfson College (Cambridge) Fellowship.
Wellcome Trust Centre for the History of Medicine Fellowship.
British Academy Visiting Fellowship.
Overseas Commonwealth Fellowship.
6th S R Nathan Fellow for the Study of Singapore at the Institute of Policy Studies (Singapore).

Membership, Award and Honor
Tan Tai Yong, is a member of the under-listed bodies:
Indian Heritage Centre Advisory Board.
Editorial boards of Modern Asian Studies.
Indian Review.
Journal of Southeast Asian Studies.
Singapore Bicentennial Advisory Panel.

At the 2009 National Day Awards, Tan was awarded the Public Administration Medal (Silver) award and was also the recipient of Teaching Excellence Award in 1992 and 2000. He is an Honorary Chairman of the National Museum of Singapore.

References

External links
 Homepage at NUS
Yale-NUS College Profile Page

Historians of South Asia
Singaporean people of Teochew descent
Yale-NUS College
Academic staff of the National University of Singapore
Singaporean Nominated Members of Parliament
Living people
National University of Singapore alumni
Singaporean historians
Year of birth missing (living people)